Marden is a civil parish in the Chichester district of West Sussex, England. It lies on the South Downs and comprises the villages of North Marden and East Marden.

Cricket
In 1680, lines written in an old bible invite: "All you that do delight in Cricket, come to Marden, pitch your wickets". This is the earliest known reference in cricket history to the wicket.

References

Cricket in Sussex
English cricket in the 14th to 17th centuries
Civil parishes in West Sussex